Agarivorans aestuarii is a Gram-negative, aerobic, non-spore-forming, rod-shaped and motile bacterium from the genus of Agarivorans which has been isolated from seawater from the Asan Bay in Korea.

References

External links
Type strain of Agarivorans aestuarii at BacDive -  the Bacterial Diversity Metadatabase

Bacteria described in 2016
Alteromonadales